Major-General Frederick Crofton Heath-Caldwell,  (né Heath: 21 February 1858 – 18 September 1945) was a senior British Army officer, who also served in the early Royal Air Force (RAF). Joining the Royal Engineers in 1877, he saw active service during the Anglo-Egyptian War, the Mahdist War, and the Boer War. During the First World War, he was posted to the War Office as Director of Military Training (1914–1916), served as General Officer Commanding (GOC) of Portsmouth (1916–1918), and, in what was to be his final military appointment, served as GOC South East Area in the newly created Royal Air Force (1918–1919). In retirement, he was a magistrate in Chester.

Personal and family life
Heath-Caldwell was the second son of Vice Admiral Sir Leopold Heath. He took the name Heath-Caldwell after inheriting the Linley Wood estate in Talke, Staffordshire in 1913 from a great aunt. In 1889, he married Constance Mary Helsham-Jones, daughter of Colonel Henry Helsham-Jones. They had two sons: Cuthbert Helsham Heath-Caldwell (1889-1979), a decorated Royal Navy officer, and Martin Frederick Heath-Caldwell (1893-1915), who was killed in action during the First World War.

A keen sportsman, he played in the 1878 FA Cup Final as part of the Royal Engineers A.F.C.

References

1858 births
1945 deaths
Royal Engineers officers
Royal Air Force generals of World War I
British Army generals of World War I
British Army personnel of the Anglo-Egyptian War
British Army personnel of the Mahdist War
British Army personnel of the Second Boer War
English justices of the peace
Companions of the Order of the Bath
Royal Engineers A.F.C. players
Association football midfielders
English footballers
FA Cup Final players